Nicholas Weston (fl. 1373–1383) of Malmesbury, Wiltshire, England, was a politician.

Family
Weston was married with two daughters. Their names are unrecorded.

Career
He was a Member (MP) of the Parliament of England for Malmesbury in 1373, May 1382, October 1382, February 1383, October 1383, November 1384, 1385 and 1386.

References

Year of birth missing
Year of death missing
English MPs 1373
English MPs May 1382
English MPs October 1382
English MPs February 1383
English MPs October 1383
English MPs November 1384
English MPs 1385
English MPs 1386
Members of the Parliament of England for Malmesbury